Bling was an amusement ride located within Blackpool Pleasure Beach in Lancashire, North West England themed to the movie with the same name. The "Star Shape" ride was built by German company Zierer in 2004, the second of three to have been built to date (the first and third being on the travelling fair circuit in Germany and the UK respectively). Bling was one of the newest additions to Pleasure Beach and was situated at the far end of the park adjacent to Burger King. It was the park's fourth tallest ride after the Pepsi Max Big One, Ice Blast and Infusion.

The ride had a minimum height requirement of 4 ft 0 in (122 cm) and a maximum height requirement of 6 ft 5 in (196 cm). Six 'gondolas' which each seat five people reach a height of 100 ft (30 m) and spin in three different directions at speeds of up to 60 mph (97 km/h).

The ride was sold to The Skyline park in Germany where it operated under its new name of Sky Jet. In 2015, Bling was replaced by a Gerstlauer Sky Fly named "Red Arrows Skyforce"

In 2020 Sky Jet was bought by Mellor's group and it was sent to Fantasy Island. It is set to open as "Turbulence" in March 2020 and will be replacing "Frisbee".

External links
 Bling at the Official Pleasure Beach Website
 Bling at Themepark Insider

Blackpool Pleasure Beach
2004 establishments in England
2011 disestablishments in England
Amusement rides introduced in 2004
Amusement rides that closed in 2011
Amusement rides manufactured by Zierer